The Rochester Skeeters was a professional basketball club based in Rochester, Minnesota that competed in the International Basketball Association beginning in the 1998-99 season. The team's head coach and general manager was basketball veteran Bill Klucas.  The team's assistant general manager was Chris Lindauer.

History 
During the first season—the team’s best, average and record-wise—they played to nearly 1,500 fans per night, finishing second in the league in average attendance. After a .500 record of 17-17, the Skeeters just missed the IBA Division playoffs.

The second season in 1999-2000 did not play out as well. Klucas and Lindauer both left the organization. New coach Greg Lockridge used 30 different players in the season. The Skeeters posted a league-worst 8-28 record (after a 4-21 start) and were the only team to not make the IBA playoffs. Attendance dropped to just over 800 a game.

The Skeeters were sold in 2000, relocated and renamed the Salina Rattlers. The Rattlers compiled a 9-31 record, averaged 577 fans a game and folded after just one season.

Season results

References

Defunct basketball teams in the United States
Basketball teams in Minnesota
Sports in Rochester, Minnesota